Amir Selmane Ramy Bensebaïni (born 16 April 1995) is an Algerian professional footballer who plays as a left-back or centre-back for Bundesliga club Borussia Mönchengladbach and the Algeria national team.

Club career

Paradou AC 
Born in Constantine, Bensebaïni began his career at Paradou AC, joining the youth team in 2008 and making his senior debut in 2013. In the summer of 2013, Bensebaïni went on trial with Porto and was later handed a two-week trial by English Premier League side Arsenal, during which he played in two friendlies with the under-21 team against Luton Town and Colchester.

In June 2014, Bensebaïni was loaned out by Paradou for one season to Belgian Pro League club Lierse. He made his full debut on 3 August in a league match against Club Brugge, coming as a 94th-minute substitute for Wanderson. Bensebaïni made 23 league appearances During the course of the season, scoring 1 goal, but could not help Lierse avoid relegation.

In June 2015, Bensebaïni was loaned out again by Paradou, this time to French club Montpellier for the 2015–16 Ligue 1 season.

Rennes 
On 5 July 2016, he signed a four-year contract with Rennes.

Borussia Mönchengladbach
On 14 August 2019, Bensebaïni signed a four-year deal to join Borussia Mönchengladbach for 8 million euros to become the most expensive Algerian defender. He made his debut for the team in the Bundesliga as a starter during a win against 1. FC Köln. On 10 November he scored his first goal with his new club against Werder Bremen. In the same game he was sent off with a red card. He scored twice in a 2–1 win against defending Bundesliga champions Bayern München on 7 December 2019.

International career
On 19 July 2015, Bensebaïni made his debut for Algeria national under-23 football team in a 2015 Africa U-23 Cup of Nations qualifying match against Sierra Leone.

In November 2015, Bensebaïni was called up to the Algeria national team for the first time for a pair of 2018 FIFA World Cup qualifiers against Tanzania.

Career statistics

Club

International

Scores and results list Algeria's goal tally first.

Honours

Club
Rennes
Coupe de France: 2018–19

International
Algeria
 Africa Cup of Nations: 2019

References

External links
 
 

Living people
1995 births
Footballers from Constantine, Algeria
Algerian expatriate footballers
Algerian expatriate sportspeople in Belgium
Algerian expatriate sportspeople in France
Association football central defenders
Association football midfielders
Algerian footballers
Expatriate footballers in Belgium
Expatriate footballers in France
Lierse S.K. players
Paradou AC players
Montpellier HSC players
Stade Rennais F.C. players
Borussia Mönchengladbach players
Ligue 1 players
Belgian Pro League players
Algeria under-23 international footballers
Algeria international footballers
2017 Africa Cup of Nations players
2019 Africa Cup of Nations players
2021 Africa Cup of Nations players
21st-century Algerian people